SYNLAB Group is an international medical diagnostics provider with laboratory services for human and veterinary medicine as well as environmental analysis. The company emerged from the combination of the two medical diagnostics providers Labco and synlab. Headquartered in Munich, Germany, the company is present in more than 40 countries on four continents and employs around 20,000 employees. The company achieved sales revenues of approximately Euro 1.9 billion in 2018.

In total, more than 400 laboratories belong to the SYNLAB hub and spoke laboratory network. The network comprises, among others, two European reference laboratories situated near Stuttgart and Barcelona as well as 31 central laboratories which are specialised and also run tests for other laboratories within the network. Regional and emergency laboratories constitute the majority of the network.

Activities
The company provides diagnostics services for human and veterinary medicine as well as for environmental analysis and for the pharmaceutical industry. The SYNLAB laboratories examine 450 million samples (e.g. urine, blood, tissue, soil, drinking water) every year on the basis of around 5,000 different test parameters. Approximately 50 new parameters are added each year.

The company provides laboratory services to patients, physicians, hospitals and veterinary clinics as well as for the industry and for research institutions.

SYNLAB`s multidisciplinary range of services includes in the field of human medicine amongst others clinical chemistry, haematology, coagulation, microbiology, serology, immunology, genetics, molecular biology, pathology, cytology, endocrinology and maternity care.

In addition, the company offers veterinary diagnostics for livestock, pets and animals competing in professional sports. In diagnostics for the pharmaceutical industry, SYNLAB collaborates with other companies and universities on drug development and drug security. Regarding the areas of environment, food and hygiene diagnostics, the company offers services with regard to air, water and soil analytics as well as food and environment security among others.

It won a tender for a centralised pathology service to serve Guy's and St Thomas' NHS Foundation Trust,  King's College Hospital NHS Foundation Trust, South London and Maudsley NHS Foundation Trust, Oxleas NHS Foundation Trust and Royal Brompton and Harefield NHS Foundation Trust for 15 years in January 2020.

Management
Mathieu Floreani is the CEO of SYNLAB Group, who changed from DHL to SYNLAB in 2018. The former CEO and co-founder of synlab, Dr. Bartl Wimmer retired from this position at the  end of March 2018. Other members of the Management Board are Dr. Santiago Valor (Chief Medical Officer), Sami Badarani (Chief Financial Officer), Robert Steinwander (Chief Operating Officer), Luis Vieira (Chief Strategy Officer) and Dr. Stuart Quin (Chief Commercial Officer).

History
In 1998, together with his partners, Dr. Bartl Wimmer founded synlab GmbH in Augsburg, Germany, as an "association of freelance laboratory physicians". In 2010 synlab took over the two laboratories Futurelab and Fleming Labs, which built the basis for several further acquisitions. Synlab was acquired by the European private equity Investor Cinven in 2015.

Labco SA was founded in 2004 by a group of French biologists as a cooperation of nine French laboratories. In 2007, Labco took over General Lab in Spain and Portugal. In August 2015, the company was acquired by the European financial investor Cinven.

Since the end of 2015, the two companies are working together as SYNLAB Group.

Owners
In August 2015, the private equity company Cinven acquired French laboratory service provider Labco. In October 2015, Cinven took over the majority of shares of SYNLAB and merged both companies to become SYNLAB Group. Before, private equity Company BC Partners was the majority shareholder of SYNLAB. In December 2016 Novo Holding A/S acquired 10% of SYNLAB shares, which was increased to about 20% in 2017.

References

Commercial laboratories
Laboratories in Germany
Companies based in Munich